Plectrelminthus is a genus of flowering plants from the orchid family, Orchidaceae.  Only one species is currently accepted, Plectrelminthus caudatus, though two varieties are recognized (as of June 2014):

Plectrelminthus caudatus var. caudatus  - western and central Africa from Sierra Leone to Congo-Kinshasa
Plectrelminthus caudatus var. trilobatus Szlach. & Olszewski - Cameroon, Central African Republic

See also 
 List of Orchidaceae genera

References 

 Berg Pana, H. 2005. Handbuch der Orchideen-Namen. Dictionary of Orchid Names. Dizionario dei nomi delle orchidee. Ulmer, Stuttgart

Orchids of Africa
Monotypic Epidendroideae genera
Vandeae genera
Angraecinae
Taxa named by Constantine Samuel Rafinesque